Itsasbegi is a railway station in Busturia, Basque Country, Spain. It is owned by Euskal Trenbide Sarea and operated by Euskotren. It lies on the Urdaibai line.

History 
The station opened as the northern terminus of the -Pedernales extension of the Amorebieta-Gernika line, on 15 March 1893. Between 1948 and 1949, due to the extension of the line towards , the station was completely renovated.

Name 
The station is in the municipality of Busturia, but primarily serves the neighboring village of Sukarrieta. As a result, the name of the station has changed at least five times throughout its history:
 Pedernales (1893 to 1903)
 Pedernales, jurisdicción Busturia (1903 to 1941)
 Pedernales (1941 to 1961)
 Pedernales-Busturia (1961 to 1980)
 Sukarrieta (1980 to 1997)
 Busturia-Itsasbegi or simply Itsasbegi (from 1997)

Services 
The station is served by Euskotren Trena line E4. It runs every 30 minutes (in each direction) during weekdays, and every hour during weekends.

References

External links
 

Euskotren Trena stations
Railway stations in Biscay
Railway stations in Spain opened in 1893